This is a list of defunct airlines of Japan.

See also
List of airlines of Japan
List of airports in Japan

References

Japan
Airlines